Oberhaag (Slovene: Osek) is a municipality in the district of Leibnitz in the Austrian state of Styria.

Geography
Oberhaag lies in the Saggau valley between Eibiswald and Arnfels. The municipality shares a 5 km border with Slovenia.

References

Cities and towns in Leibnitz District